Phillips Library may refer to:

 Phillips Library (Massachusetts), a rare books and special collections library part of the Peabody Essex Museum (PEM).
 Phillips Library, a building on the campus of Aurora University
 Phillips Library, a building on the campus of The Orme School
 John Phillips Library, a building at the Kingswood campus of Western Sydney University
 Phillips Free Public Library in Phillipston, Massachusetts
 Phillips Memorial Library, a building on the campus of Providence College (Rhode Island)